The 1991–92 NBA season  was the Jazz's 18th season in the National Basketball Association, and 13th season in Salt Lake City, Utah. It was also their first season playing at the Delta Center. The Jazz got off to a 7–6 start as the team traded Thurl Bailey to the Minnesota Timberwolves in exchange for Tyrone Corbin near the end of November. In December, during a home game against the Detroit Pistons, Karl Malone committed a flagrant foul on Isiah Thomas, in which Malone hit Thomas's forehead with his elbow, and Thomas had to receive 40 stitches; Malone was suspended for one game. The Jazz held a 31–18 record at the All-Star break, and won their final seven games, finishing first in the Midwest Division with a 55–27 record. They made their ninth consecutive trip to the playoffs.

Malone averaged 28.0 points and 11.2 rebounds per game, and was named to the All-NBA First Team, and finished in fourth place in Most Valuable Player voting, while John Stockton averaged 15.8 points, 13.7 assists and 3.0 steals per game, leading the league in assists for the fifth straight season, while being named to the All-NBA Second Team, and NBA All-Defensive Second Team. Both Malone and Stockton were selected for the 1992 NBA All-Star Game. In addition, Jeff Malone finished second on the team in scoring averaging 20.2 points per game, while Blue Edwards provided them with 12.6 points per game, and Mark Eaton led the team with 2.5 blocks per game.

In the Western Conference First Round of the playoffs, the Jazz defeated the Los Angeles Clippers in five games. Then in the Western Conference Semi-finals, they defeated the 6th-seeded Seattle SuperSonics in five games. However, the Jazz would lose to Clyde Drexler and the top-seeded Portland Trail Blazers four games to two in the Western Conference Finals. The Blazers would lose in six games to the defending champion Chicago Bulls in the NBA Finals. 

Following the season, Edwards and top draft pick Eric Murdock were both traded to the Milwaukee Bucks.

Draft picks

Roster

Regular season

Season standings

y – clinched division title
x – clinched playoff spot

z – clinched division title
y – clinched division title
x – clinched playoff spot

Record vs. opponents

Game log

Regular season

|- align="center" bgcolor="#ccffcc"
| 1
| November 1
| @ Minnesota
| W 112–97
|
|
|
| Target Center
| 1–0
|- align="center" bgcolor="#ffcccc"
| 2
| November 2
| @ Indiana
| L 112–127
|
|
|
| Market Square Arena
| 1–1
|- align="center" bgcolor="#ffcccc"
| 3
| November 5
| @ Atlanta
| L 94–98
|
|
|
| The Omni
| 1–2
|- align="center" bgcolor="#ffcccc"
| 4
| November 7
| Seattle
| L 95–103
|
|
|
| Delta Center
| 1–3
|- align="center" bgcolor="#ccffcc"
| 5
| November 9
| L.A. Clippers
| W 101–84
|
|
|
| Delta Center
| 2–3
|- align="center" bgcolor="#ccffcc"
| 6
| November 11
| Sacramento
| W 106–90
|
|
|
| Delta Center
| 3–3
|- align="center" bgcolor="#ccffcc"
| 7
| November 13
| @ New Jersey
| W 98–92
|
|
|
| Brendan Byrne Arena
| 4–3
|- align="center" bgcolor="#ffcccc"
| 8
| November 15
| @ Detroit
| L 115–123
|
|
|
| Palace of Auburn Hills
| 4–4
|- align="center" bgcolor="#ccffcc"
| 9
| November 16
| @ Washington
| W 107–98
|
|
|
| Capital Centre
| 5–4
|- align="center" bgcolor="#ffcccc"
| 10
| November 19
| @ Miami
| L 91–111
|
|
|
| Miami Arena
| 5–5
|- align="center" bgcolor="#ccffcc"
| 11
| November 20
| @ Orlando
| W 107–102
|
|
|
| Orlando Arena
| 6–5
|- align="center" bgcolor="#ccffcc"
| 12
| November 22
| Denver
| W 121–96
|
|
|
| Delta Center
| 7–5
|- align="center" bgcolor="#ffcccc"
| 13
| November 23
| @ Dallas
| L 109–121 (OT)
|
|
|
| Reunion Arena
| 7–6
|- align="center" bgcolor="#ccffcc"
| 14
| November 27
| Charlotte
| W 113–107
|
|
|
| Delta Center
| 8–6
|- align="center" bgcolor="#ccffcc"
| 15
| November 29
| Golden State
| W 135–108
|
|
|
| Delta Center
| 9–6
|- align="center" bgcolor="#ffcccc"
| 16
| November 30
| @ Phoenix
| L 125–134 (OT)
|
|
|
| Arizona Veterans Memorial Coliseum
| 9–7

|- align="center" bgcolor="#ffcccc"
| 17
| December 3
| @ Golden State
| L 103–108
|
|
|
| Oakland–Alameda County Coliseum Arena
| 9–8
|- align="center" bgcolor="#ccffcc"
| 18
| December 4
| Washington
| W 101–74
|
|
|
| Delta Center
| 10–8
|- align="center" bgcolor="#ccffcc"
| 19
| December 6
| @ San Antonio
| W 93–92
|
|
|
| HemisFair Arena
| 11–8
|- align="center" bgcolor="#ccffcc"
| 20
| December 7
| @ Houston
| W 96–91
|
|
|
| The Summit
| 12–8
|- align="center" bgcolor="#ccffcc"
| 21
| December 10
| Orlando
| W 122–103
|
|
|
| Delta Center
| 13–8
|- align="center" bgcolor="#ccffcc"
| 22
| December 11
| @ L.A. Lakers
| W 101–95
|
|
|
| Great Western Forum
| 14–8
|- align="center" bgcolor="#ffcccc"
| 23
| December 13
| @ L.A. Clippers
| L 101–102 (OT)
|
|
|
| Los Angeles Memorial Sports Arena
| 14–9
|- align="center" bgcolor="#ccffcc"
| 24
| December 14
| Detroit
| W 102–100
|
|
|
| Delta Center
| 15–9
|- align="center" bgcolor="#ccffcc"
| 25
| December 17
| @ Charlotte
| W 122–102
|
|
|
| Charlotte Coliseum
| 16–9
|- align="center" bgcolor="#ffcccc"
| 26
| December 18
| @ Philadelphia
| W 107–105
|
|
|
| The Spectrum
| 17–9
|- align="center" bgcolor="#ffcccc"
| 27
| December 20
| @ Boston
| L 101–112
|
|
|
| Boston Garden
| 17–10
|- align="center" bgcolor="#ffcccc"
| 28
| December 21
| @ New York
| L 97–106
|
|
|
| Madison Square Garden
| 17–11
|- align="center" bgcolor="#ffcccc"
| 29
| December 23
| @ Cleveland
| L 112–113
|
|
|
| Richfield Coliseum
| 17–12
|- align="center" bgcolor="#ccffcc"
| 30
| December 26
| L.A. Clippers
| W 123–115
|
|
|
| Delta Center
| 18–12
|- align="center" bgcolor="#ccffcc"
| 31
| December 28
| Miami
| W 128–103
|
|
|
| Delta Center
| 19–12

|- align="center" bgcolor="#ccffcc"
| 32
| January 2
| Portland
| W 107–103
|
|
|
| Delta Center
| 20–12
|- align="center" bgcolor="#ccffcc"
| 33
| January 4
| Dallas
| W 113–78
|
|
|
| Delta Center
| 21–12
|- align="center" bgcolor="#ccffcc"
| 34
| January 6
| Indiana
| W 124–108
|
|
|
| Delta Center
| 22–12
|- align="center" bgcolor="#ffcccc"
| 35
| January 8
| @ Milwaukee
| L 98–99
|
|
|
| Bradley Center
| 22–13
|- align="center" bgcolor="#ffcccc"
| 36
| January 10
| @ Chicago
| L 90–105
|
|
|
| Chicago Stadium
| 22–14
|- align="center" bgcolor="#ffcccc"
| 37
| January 11
| @ Minnesota
| L 96–101
|
|
|
| Target Center
| 22–15
|- align="center" bgcolor="#ccffcc"
| 38
| January 14
| Minnesota
| W 116–110
|
|
|
| Delta Center
| 23–15
|- align="center" bgcolor="#ccffcc"
| 39
| January 16
| Atlanta
| W 116–111
|
|
|
| Delta Center
| 24–15
|- align="center" bgcolor="#ccffcc"
| 40
| January 18
| Houston
| W 108–80
|
|
|
| Delta Center
| 25–15
|- align="center" bgcolor="#ccffcc"
| 41
| January 22
| San Antonio
| W 100–98
|
|
|
| Delta Center
| 26–15
|- align="center" bgcolor="#ffcccc"
| 42
| January 23
| @ Denver
| L 111–115
|
|
|
| McNichols Sports Arena
| 26–16
|- align="center" bgcolor="#ccffcc"
| 43
| January 25
| @ Seattle
| W 104–103
|
|
|
| Seattle Center Coliseum
| 26–17
|- align="center" bgcolor="#ffcccc"
| 44
| January 27
| New York
| L 80–97
|
|
|
| Delta Center
| 27–17
|- align="center" bgcolor="#ccffcc"
| 45
| January 29
| Sacramento
| W 124–105
|
|
|
| Delta Center
| 28–17
|- align="center" bgcolor="#ccffcc"
| 46
| January 31
| Phoenix
| W 117–116 (OT)
|
|
|
| Delta Center
| 29–17

|- align="center" bgcolor="#ccffcc"
| 47
| February 1
| @ Dallas
| W 104–90
|
|
|
| Reunion Arena
| 30–17
|- align="center" bgcolor="#ccffcc"
| 48
| February 3
| Chicago
| W 126–123 (3OT)
|
|
|
| Delta Center
| 31–17
|- align="center" bgcolor="#ffcccc"
| 49
| February 5
| @ Sacramento
| L 98–100
|
|
|
| ARCO Arena
| 31–18
|- align="center" bgcolor="#ccffcc"
| 50
| February 11
| Cleveland
| W 111–109
|
|
|
| Delta Center
| 32–18
|- align="center" bgcolor="#ccffcc"
| 51
| February 13
| L.A. Lakers
| W 97–91
|
|
|
| Delta Center
| 33–18
|- align="center" bgcolor="#ccffcc"
| 52
| February 15
| Denver
| W 106–93
|
|
|
| Delta Center
| 34–18
|- align="center" bgcolor="#ccffcc"
| 53
| February 17
| Boston
| W 88–83
|
|
|
| Delta Center
| 35–18
|- align="center" bgcolor="#ccffcc"
| 54
| February 19
| Dallas
| W 118–96
|
|
|
| Delta Center
| 36–18
|- align="center" bgcolor="#ccffcc"
| 55
| February 21
| Houston
| W 124–97
|
|
|
| Delta Center
| 37–18
|- align="center" bgcolor="#ffcccc"
| 56
| February 24
| @ Portland
| L 107–110
|
|
|
| Memorial Coliseum
| 37–19
|- align="center" bgcolor="#ccffcc"
| 57
| February 25
| @ L.A. Clippers
| W 106–101
|
|
|
| Los Angeles Memorial Sports Arena
| 38–19
|- align="center" bgcolor="#ffcccc"
| 58
| February 27
| Seattle
| L 124–130 (OT)
|
|
|
| Delta Center
| 38–20

|- align="center" bgcolor="#ffcccc"
| 59
| March 1
| @ Phoenix
| L 109–114
|
|
|
| Arizona Veterans Memorial Coliseum
| 38–21
|- align="center" bgcolor="#ccffcc"
| 60
| March 3
| @ Golden State
| W 123–101
|
|
|
| Oakland–Alameda County Coliseum Arena
| 39–21
|- align="center" bgcolor="#ccffcc"
| 61
| March 4
| San Antonio
| W 102–93
|
|
|
| Delta Center
| 40–21
|- align="center" bgcolor="#ccffcc"
| 62
| March 6
| New Jersey
| W 117–96
|
|
|
| Delta Center
| 41–21
|- align="center" bgcolor="#ccffcc"
| 63
| March 8
| @ Denver
| W 112–88
|
|
|
| McNichols Sports Arena
| 42–21
|- align="center" bgcolor="#ccffcc"
| 64
| March 12
| @ Sacramento
| W 114–103
|
|
|
| ARCO Arena
| 43–21
|- align="center" bgcolor="#ffcccc"
| 65
| March 14
| @ San Antonio
| L 106–113
|
|
|
| HemisFair Arena
| 43–22
|- align="center" bgcolor="#ffcccc"
| 66
| March 15
| @ Houston
| L 97–106
|
|
|
| The Summit
| 43–23
|- align="center" bgcolor="#ccffcc"
| 67
| March 19
| Denver
| W 115–100
|
|
|
| Delta Center
| 44–23
|- align="center" bgcolor="#ccffcc"
| 68
| March 21
| Portland
| W 95–77
|
|
|
| Delta Center
| 45–23
|- align="center" bgcolor="#ccffcc"
| 69
| March 25
| Philadelphia
| W 100–94
|
|
|
| Delta Center
| 46–23
|- align="center" bgcolor="#ffcccc"
| 70
| March 27
| L.A. Lakers
| L 92–103
|
|
|
| Delta Center
| 46–24
|- align="center" bgcolor="#ccffcc"
| 71
| March 30
| Milwaukee
| W 120–100
|
|
|
| Delta Center
| 47–24
|- align="center" bgcolor="#ffcccc"
| 72
| March 31
| @ Seattle
| L 103–122
|
|
|
| Seattle Center Coliseum
| 47–25

|- align="center" bgcolor="#ffcccc"
| 73
| April 2
| @ Portland
| L 86–118
|
|
|
| Memorial Coliseum
| 47–26
|- align="center" bgcolor="#ccffcc"
| 74
| April 3
| Phoenix
| W 113–94
|
|
|
| Delta Center
| 48–26
|- align="center" bgcolor="#ffcccc"
| 75
| April 5
| @ Minnesota
| L 91–93
|
|
|
| Target Center
| 48–27
|- align="center" bgcolor="#ccffcc"
| 76
| April 7
| @ Denver
| W 124–101
|
|
|
| McNichols Sports Arena
| 49–27
|- align="center" bgcolor="#ccffcc"
| 77
| April 9
| Dallas
| W 113–90
|
|
|
| Delta Center
| 50–27
|- align="center" bgcolor="#ccffcc"
| 78
| April 11
| @ L.A. Lakers
| W 93–90
|
|
|
| Great Western Forum
| 51–27
|- align="center" bgcolor="#ccffcc"
| 79
| April 13
| Golden State
| W 138–99
|
|
|
| Delta Center
| 52–27
|- align="center" bgcolor="#ccffcc"
| 80
| April 15
| Houston
| W 130–98
|
|
|
| Delta Center
| 53–27
|- align="center" bgcolor="#ccffcc"
| 81
| April 17
| Minnesota
| W 120–106
|
|
|
| Delta Center
| 54–27
|- align="center" bgcolor="#ccffcc"
| 82
| April 19
| @ San Antonio
| W 101–90
|
|
|
| HemisFair Arena
| 55–27

Playoffs

|- align="center" bgcolor="#ccffcc"
| 1
| April 24
| L.A. Clippers
| W 115–97
| Karl Malone (32)
| Karl Malone (10)
| John Stockton (21)
| Delta Center19,911
| 1–0
|- align="center" bgcolor="#ccffcc"
| 2
| April 26
| L.A. Clippers
| W 103–92
| Karl Malone (32)
| Karl Malone (13)
| John Stockton (19)
| Delta Center19,911
| 2–0
|- align="center" bgcolor="#ffcccc"
| 3
| April 28
| @ L.A. Clippers
| L 88–98
| Karl Malone (22)
| Karl Malone (10)
| John Stockton (13)
| Los Angeles Memorial Sports Arena14,086
| 2–1
|- align="center" bgcolor="#ffcccc"
| 4
| May 3
| @ L.A. Clippers
| L 107–115
| Karl Malone (44)
| Karl Malone (11)
| John Stockton (18)
| Anaheim Convention Center7,148
| 2–2
|- align="center" bgcolor="#ccffcc"
| 5
| May 4
| L.A. Clippers
| W 98–89
| Jeff Malone (25)
| Karl Malone (16)
| John Stockton (9)
| Delta Center19,911
| 3–2
|-

|- align="center" bgcolor="#ccffcc"
| 1
| May 6
| Seattle
| W 108–100
| Karl Malone (30)
| Karl Malone (10)
| John Stockton (15)
| Delta Center19,911
| 1–0
|- align="center" bgcolor="#ccffcc"
| 2
| May 8
| Seattle
| W 103–97
| Karl Malone (28)
| Karl Malone (12)
| John Stockton (14)
| Delta Center19,911
| 2–0
|- align="center" bgcolor="#ffcccc"
| 3
| May 10
| @ Seattle
| L 98–104
| Karl Malone (30)
| Karl Malone (8)
| John Stockton (11)
| Seattle Center Coliseum14,104
| 2–1
|- align="center" bgcolor="#ccffcc"
| 4
| May 12
| @ Seattle
| W 89–83
| Jeff Malone (24)
| Karl Malone (8)
| John Stockton (13)
| Seattle Center Coliseum14,252
| 3–1
|- align="center" bgcolor="#ccffcc"
| 5
| May 14
| Seattle
| W 111–100
| Karl Malone (37)
| Karl Malone (13)
| John Stockton (17)
| Delta Center19,911
| 4–1
|-

|- align="center" bgcolor="#ffcccc"
| 1
| May 16
| @ Portland
| L 88–113
| Jeff Malone (15)
| K. Malone, Thornton (7)
| John Stockton (9)
| Memorial Coliseum12,888
| 0–1
|- align="center" bgcolor="#ffcccc"
| 2
| May 19
| @ Portland
| L 102–119
| Karl Malone (25)
| Karl Malone (11)
| John Stockton (11)
| Memorial Coliseum12,888
| 0–2
|- align="center" bgcolor="#ccffcc"
| 3
| May 22
| Portland
| W 97–89
| Karl Malone (39)
| K. Malone, Eaton (7)
| John Stockton (10)
| Delta Center19,911
| 1–2
|- align="center" bgcolor="#ccffcc"
| 4
| May 24
| Portland
| W 121–112
| Karl Malone (33)
| Karl Malone (12)
| John Stockton (15)
| Delta Center19,911
| 2–2
|- align="center" bgcolor="#ffcccc"
| 5
| May 26
| @ Portland
| L 121–127 (OT)
| Karl Malone (38)
| Karl Malone (14)
| John Stockton (10)
| Memorial Coliseum12,888
| 2–3
|- align="center" bgcolor="#ffcccc"
| 6
| May 28
| Portland
| L 97–105
| Karl Malone (23)
| Karl Malone (19)
| John Stockton (12)
| Delta Center19,911
| 2–4
|-

Player statistics

Season

Playoffs

Player Statistics Citation:

Awards and records
 Karl Malone, All-NBA First Team
 John Stockton, All-NBA Second Team
 John Stockton, NBA All-Defensive Second Team

Transactions

References

See also
 1991–92 NBA season

Utah Jazz seasons
Utah
Utah
Utah